The Ming dynasty (1368–1644) was an imperial dynasty of China.

Ming Dynasty may also refer to:
Southern Ming (1644–1662), loyalist regimes in southern China following the Ming dynasty's collapse
Ming Dynasty (horse), Australian Thoroughbred racehorse
Ming Dynasty (2007 TV series), Chinese television series taking place during the reign of the 16th monarch, the Tianqi Emperor, 1620–1627
 Ming Dynasty (2019 TV series), Chinese television series also called Empress of Ming, which primarily takes place during the reigns of the 3rd to 8th emperors in the early to mid-1400s

See also
Min kingdom, a 10th-century dynasty in modern Fujian